Carlos Arias may refer to: 

Carlos Arias Ortiz, Mexican biochemist; winner of the Carlos J. Finlay Prize for Microbiology (UNESCO, 2001)
Carlos Andrés Arias (born 1986), Chilean football (soccer) goalkeeper
Carlos Erwin Arias (born 1982), Bolivian football (soccer) goalkeeper
Carlos Arias Torrico